Northwestern College (NC), formerly Northwestern Business College, is a for-profit institution of higher education located in Bridgeview, Illinois. The school offers an associate in applied science degree programs and certificate programs in online and on-campus settings. It has no affiliation with Northwestern University.

Academics
The College consists of the following four academic schools:
 The School of Commerce & Technology for associate degrees and certificates;
 The School of Legal Studies for associate degrees and certificates;
 The School of Health Sciences for associate degrees and certificates;
 The School of Nursing for associate degrees

NC offers associate degrees in the following programs:

 Business Administration
 Criminal Justice
 Diagnostic Medical Sonography
 Executive Accounting
 Health Information Technology
 Massage Therapy
 Medical Assisting
 Nursing
 Paralegal
 Radiologic Technology

NC also offers certificates in the following programs:

 Coding Specialist
 Massage Therapy
 Paralegal

Services to students
Northwestern College has resources  to support students from enrollment to graduation and  beyond. Among them are:

 academic advising
 financial assistance
 financial planning
 peer and professional tutors
 counseling services
 services for students with disabilities
 clubs, organizations, and honors societies
 new student orientation
 lifetime employment assistance
 the library/resource center
 the college bookstore

Alumni
 Ernst J. Hoesly, businessman and politician
 John Wayne Gacy, businessman and serial killer
 John Loebs, politician

Accreditation
 Northwestern College is accredited by the Higher Learning Commission and is a member of the North Central Association of Colleges and Schools.
 Northwestern College is approved by the United States Department of Justice, Immigration and Naturalization Service as an institution of higher education for training international students.

References

External links
 

Educational institutions established in 1902
For-profit universities and colleges in the United States
Universities and colleges in Chicago
Universities and colleges in Cook County, Illinois
Two-year colleges in the United States
Private universities and colleges in Illinois
1902 establishments in Illinois